In measure and probability theory in mathematics, a convex measure is a probability measure that — loosely put — does not assign more mass to any intermediate set "between" two measurable sets A and B than it does to A or B individually.  There are multiple ways in which the comparison between the probabilities of A and B and the intermediate set can be made, leading to multiple definitions of convexity, such as log-concavity, harmonic convexity, and so on.  The mathematician Christer Borell was a pioneer of the detailed study of convex measures on locally convex spaces in the 1970s.

General definition and special cases

Let X be a locally convex Hausdorff vector space, and consider a probability measure μ on the Borel σ-algebra of X.  Fix −∞ ≤ s ≤ 0, and define, for u, v ≥ 0 and 0 ≤ λ ≤ 1,

For subsets A and B of X, we write

for their Minkowski sum.  With this notation, the measure μ is said to be s-convex if, for all Borel-measurable subsets A and B of X and all 0 ≤ λ ≤ 1,

The special case s = 0 is the inequality

i.e.

Thus, a measure being 0-convex is the same thing as it being a logarithmically concave measure.

Properties

The classes of s-convex measures form a nested increasing family as s decreases to −∞"

or, equivalently

Thus, the collection of −∞-convex measures is the largest such class, whereas the 0-convex measures (the logarithmically concave measures) are the smallest class.

The convexity of a measure μ on n-dimensional Euclidean space Rn in the sense above is closely related to the convexity of its probability density function.

Convex measures also satisfy a zero-one law:  if G is a measurable additive subgroup of the vector space X (i.e. a measurable linear subspace), then the inner measure of G under μ,

must be 0 or 1.   (In the case that μ is a Radon measure, and hence inner regular, the measure μ and its inner measure coincide, so the μ-measure of G is then 0 or 1.)

References

Measures (measure theory)